The Liquid Jungle Lab (LJL) is a tropical marine research station on the island of Canales de Tierra on the western coast of Pacific Panamá along a primary marine biological corridor. The LJL research campus was completed in 2004 and is part of a private 3,500 hectare reserve composed of primary forest, mangroves, tide pools, and a rocky inter-tidal zone that transitions into fringing coral reefs.

The island laboratory is adjacent to two large coastal bays, Bahia Honda, Veraguas Province and Pixvae Bay, which are important mangrove, estuarine and riparian (stream) habitats. The island and laboratory serve as a strategic base for ecologic research of the Coiba National Park, a  UNESCO World Heritage Site and Panama’s largest marine protected area. The tremendous biodiversity of the marine and terrestrial environments surrounding Isla Canales de Tierra allows visiting scientists to conduct multidisciplinary ecologic research in a pristine area and has even inspired a designer perfume fragrance, Fleur de Liane. The LJL was founded by Jean Pigozzi, a Swiss venture capitalist, photographer and art collector.

Research

A multi-disciplinary approach to research in Terrestrial and Marine Tropical Ecology are conducted between a consortium of scientists and researchers from the Woods Hole Oceanographic Institution, the Smithsonian Tropical Research Institute, and Real Jardin Botanico de Madrid. These organizations and visiting scientists and students use the marine lab facilities and experimental farm to conduct primary and applied research in the fields of tropical island ecology, marine biology, physical oceanography, marine biogeochemistry, aquaculture, genetics, molecular biology, herpetology, botany, ornithology, entomology, ecosystem conservation, island biogeography, geology, fisheries management, tropical forest ecology, agro-forestry, veterinary science, and organic agriculture.

Marine Science

Current areas of marine research at the Liquid Jungle include plankton community dynamics and marine larval ecology and transport, modeling internal waves and benthic structure, coral community architecture and diversity, synoptic chemical mapping, invasive sessile invertebrate species, mangrove and estuarine watersheds, and the effects of natural and anthropogenic nutrient input on primary production and fisheries along Pacific coastal zones.

Terrestrial Science

The local fauna includes a long list of avian species such as toucans (Ramphastos sulfuratus), owls (Pulsatrix perspicillata)  humming birds (Hylocharys elicieae, Phaetornis superciliosus), manakins (Chiroxiphia lanceolata) pelicans and a plethora of other marine birds. Many mammals, unique to Central America inhabit the island such as howler monkeys (Allouatta palliata, and the endemic Coiba species Alouatta coibensis), capuchin monkeys (Cebus capucinus) coatis (Nasua narica), raccoons (Procyon cancrivorus), pacas (Agouti paca), agoutis or nueques (Dasyprocta sp), tayras (Eira barbara), bats (Glossophaga soricina &Carollia castanea) sloths (Bradypus variegatus) margays (Leopardus wiedii) and white-tailed deer (Odocoileus virginianus).  Besides the thousands of species of plants and insects endemic to this region of the tropical Americas, many reptile and amphibian species are also found on the island.  Even occasionally the rare jungle cat (Leopardus pardalis) is spotted in the dense jungle surrounding nearby Bahia Honda and Pixvae. In 2004 botanists, herpetologists, entomologists, ornithologists, and biologists convened to create the first comprehensive catalog of tropical plants, reptiles, insect, birds, and mammal diversity of this Pacific Coastal region.

Regional Geography and Geology
Geography of Panama
The Gulf of Chiriquí contains several prominent, offshore island complexes including Isla Coiba (493 km2), Isla Cébaco (80 km2) Islas Ladrones, Islas Secas, and Islas Contreras. Other islands like Jicarón, Leones, Gobernadora, Verde, Canales de Afuera, Ranchería, Papagayo, Canales de Tierra, and Jicarita are part of a group of more than forty smaller island clusters scattered near the coast. Coastal areas in the gulf are a mélange of mid to late Tertiary volcanics, and much newer Quaternary period alluvial sedimentary series. Smaller island clusters are predominantly basalt outcrops once associated with the mainland before sea level rise. Coiba Island, the largest in the region, shares geomorphologies similar to the mainland Azuero peninsula.

Climate and Oceanographic conditions of Pacific Panama.
The climate of Panamá is largely affected by the position of a low atmospheric pressure zone known as the Intertropical Convergence Zone (ITCZ) which also affects seasonal evolution of geostrophic currents in the Panamá Bight. During the rainy season (December through May), the ITCZ is located to the North of Panamá and produces light and variable winds and ocean circulation in the Panamá Bight is anticyclonic (west) which creates a southerly flowing coastal current. As a result of these punctuated seasonal movements of the ITCZ, Panamá experiences high seasonal rainfall often reaching more than 3000 mm/yr. Starting in October and continuing into the dry season (January to March) the ITCZ moves South of Panamá, producing a dominant period of northeasterly tradewinds known as the Panamá Jet, which results in a reversal of water circulation and becomes a cyclonic gyre with a coastal current flowing to the north. Upwelling develops in the Gulf of Panama during the dry season when northeast tradewinds from the Caribbean blow over to the Pacific through a physiographic gap in the central mountain range which divides the Isthmus. This wind stress creates seasonal Ekman spiral pumping and displaces nutrient-poor coastal surface water with cool, nutrient rich, water masses.

Seasonal effects on Marine Life
This nutrient rich upwelling such as occurs in the Gulf of Panama, can stimulate Plankton production leading to blooms of centric, colonial, and penate diatoms and dinoflagellates. Zooplankton populations often respond to this by subsequently increasing growth and reproduction rates. Scientists are now able to quantify the abundance and diversity of these microscopic organisms in-situ with sensors such as the Video Plankton Recorder (a specialized underwater microscope and imaging system).

Panama Liquid Jungle Underwater Tropical Observatory PLUTO

In order to understand oceanic and atmospheric coupling, and the potential effects of these phenomena on ocean life, scientists must collect time series data which measure weather patterns, ocean circulation and sea water chemistry. PLUTO is a fiber-optic cabled observatory deployed in January 2006 in approximately 18 m of water 1.5 km to the south west of Isla de Canales de Tierra. The observatory consists of sensors for salinity, temperature, pressure, water current speed and direction, chlorophyll, turbidity, oxygen, down-welling light at two depths, an array of temperature sensors. A remotely controlled, high definition pan and tilt underwater camera displays rapid image updates of the benthic habitat surrounding the PLUTO sensors. The data are distributed via satellite back to WHOI and made available on the web (http://4dgeo.whoi.edu/panama/).

Coral Reefs of the Eastern Tropical Pacific (ETP)
Coral reefs usually exist in the euphotic zone (shallow areas of the sea where light can penetrate) along coastal or island areas, and require clear, oligotrophic (low nutrient) water in a narrow temperature and salinity range.  Littoral areas located along the Southern Isthmus of Panamá demonstrate highly complex ecological interactions and distributions of endemic and migratory marine species due in part to the overlap of continental ecotones, tropical weather patterns and the convergence of powerful sea currents. In the Republic of Panamá, there is estimated 290 km2 of reefs along both Caribbean and Pacific coasts, however much higher diversity (about 68 hard coral species) occurs in the Caribbean, compared to 33 known species from 11 genera living along the Pacific coast.  
The Eastern Tropical Pacific (ETP) is a biotope known for intrinsically low coral species diversity which unfortunately enhances the potential threats to these coral reef systems. Besides the direct effects of overfishing, anchor damage, and coral mining, terrestrial land use affects coral reef habitats in more indirect ways.  Panamá experiences high seasonal rainfall (3000 mm/yr.) and  reefs can be severely impacted if corals are chronically exposed to the runoff of nutrients originating from deforestation and soil erosion, fertilizers, pesticides or untreated sewage.  In addition to being a primary area for cattle ranching and agriculture, unregulated construction, septic waste increase and local coastal population expansion poses a tangible threat to the biological integrity of coral reefs   surrounding the Coiba Island Marine Protected Area (MPA).    Mangrove areas of Bahia Honda, Pixvae, and Puerto Mutis are important for the health of the local reefs, because mangroves not only filter the nutrients emptying onto reefs, but are important nurseries for juvenile fish, epibionts, crustaceans (i.e. shrimp), and other invertebrates that serve as critical food sources and spawning grounds for the offshore marine systems (i.e. Coiba and Cebaco islands).  Scientists from around the world use the Liquid Jungle Lab facilities to study these reef systems in greater detail in order to establish ecologic baselines and understand natural and human impacts to the fish and marine life that rely on these habitats.

Reef Building Corals (Scleractinia) of the Gulf of Chiriqui including Bahia Honda to Coiba Island marine zones

Family Agariciidae: Pavona clavus, Gardineroseris planulata, Pavona gigantea, Pavona varians, Pavona Chiriquíensis, Pavona frondifera, Pavona maldivensis Pocilloporidae: Pocillopora elegans, Pocillopora damicornis, Pocillorpora capitata, Pocillorpora eydouxi; Poritidae: Porites lobata; Siderastreidae: Psammacora stellata. Fungiidae:  Cyclocerus curvata Milleporadea: Millepora intricata Dendrophyllidae: Tubastraea coccinea

References

Further reading
Bibliography of scientific research conducted at the Liquid Jungle Lab, Panama

Almany, G. R., M.L. Berumen, S.R. Thorrold, S. Planes, and G.P. Jones. Larval dispersal, marine reserves and the replenishment of fish populations. (Accepted pending suitable revision) Science

Bowen, J.L. and Ivan Valiela (2008) Using δ15N to Assess Coupling between Watersheds and Estuaries in Temperate and Tropical Regions. Journal of Coastal Research Vol 24:3; pp. 804–813.

Camilli, Luis, O. Pizarro, and R. Camilli (2008) Advancing spatial-temporal continuity in coral reef ecosystem pattern detection:  The morphology, distribution and chemical environments of coral habitats encompassing Coiba National Park, Panamá.  Proceedings of the 11th International Coral Reef Symposium, Ft. Lauderdale, Florida, 7–11 July 2008, Session number 16

Camilli Richard, O. Pizarro, and L. Camilli (2007) Rapid Swath Mapping of Reef Ecology and Associated Water Column Chemistry in the Gulf of Chiriquí, Panamá On the Edge of Tomorrow: MTS/IEEE-OES Oceans Conference.

Carman Mary R., S.J. Molyneaux, R. Ji, and S.M. Sievert (2007) Ascidians of the southern Gulf of Chiriqui, Pacific-Panama: A native fauna at risk to bioinvasion. Fifth International Conference on Marine Bioinvasions.

Carman, Mary, S. Bullard, S. Molyneaux, R. Ji, A. Goodwin, E. Baker, and S. Sievert. Ascidian faunas of the island chain Isla Canales de Tierra to Coiba, southern Gulf of Chiriqui and south entrance to the Panama Canal, Pacific coast of Panama. (in prep)

Castroviejo S., and A. Ibanez (2003) Estudio Sobre la Biodiversidad de la Region de Bahia Honda (Veraguas, Panama) Inventario de Biodiversidad. Real Jardin Botanico(CSIC) (133).

Gallager, Scott M., S. Lerner, E. Miller, A.D. York, and A. Girard. Design, installation, and the first two years of operation of an underwater observatory on the western Panamanian shelf. (submitted)

Gallager, Scott M., A.D. York, C. Mingione and S. Lerner. Plankton community structure in the Gulf of Chiriqui, Pacific-Panama, as modulated by upwelling and large internal waves. (in prep)

Pineda, J., Reyns, N., Starczak, V.R., 2009. Complexity and simplification in understanding recruitment in benthic populations. Popul Ecol 51, 17-32.

Thorrold, Simon R., G.P. Jones, S. Planes, and J. A. Hare. (2006) Transgenerational marking of embryonic otoliths in marine fishes using barium stable isotopes. Can. J. Fish. Aquat. Sci. 63: 1193-1197.

Starczak, V., P. Pérez-Brunius, P., J. Pineda, H. Levine and J. Gyory (2011) The role of season and salinity in influencing barnacle distributions in two adjacent mangrove coastal lagoons. Bulletin of Marine Science. 87(3):275–299..

External links
 Liquid Jungle Laboratory official website
 PLUTO website (The Panama Liquid Jungle Laboratory Underwater Tropical Observatory)

Science and technology in Panama
Research stations
Buildings and structures completed in 2004